The 2006 Vo Vietnam World cup were the second edition of the Vovinam VietVoDao World Cup, and were held in Algiers, Algeria from 28 to 30

Medal summary

Blue belt 
Source:

Technical winner cup children

Technical winner cup female

Technical winner cup male

Black Belt
Source:

Technical winner cup

Sparring winner cup female

Sparring winner cup male

Medal table 

Source:

References

2006 in Algerian sport
2006 in martial arts
Sports competitions in Algiers